Galina Pavlovna Konshina (born December 17, 1951, Barnaul)  is a Soviet and Russian theater, cinema, television and stage actress

Biography
Galina Konshina was born on December 17, 1951 in   Barnaul. In fact, Galina was born on December 6, but because of forty-degree frosts, her father went to issue a certificate of her birth only on December 17.

In school years she was engaged in amateur art activities, went to drama school. Quite early began to parody neighbors, teachers, as well as popular pop singers Klavdiya Shulzhenko and Maya Kristalinskaya.

In 1974 she graduated from the acting department of the Russian Academy of Theatre Arts (GITIS) (workshop of Vsevolod  Ostalsky).

Having received a diploma of theater and film actresses, together with her husband, director Yuri  Nepomnyashchy, they created the  Theater of Little Comedies, in which they played both one-act French plays and comedy and sharp-screen miniatures of Russian authors. The theater traveled the whole former USSR with a tour, but in 1987 it was closed.

In 1979 she took part in the All-Union Competition of Variety Artists, the main award (the third prize, since the first two prizes were not awarded), which she shared in the speech genre with Yan Arlazorov.

From 1988 to 1994 she starred in the comic TV show  .

From 1990 to 2001 — Artist of the Moscow Concert Association  Estrada.

In 1993-1996 she played in the Moscow Communion State Drama Theater.

Galina Konshina received nationwide fame after participating in the Channel One Russia parody show Big Difference, where she parodied Jorge Garcia, Marina Golub, Tatyana Tolstaya, Tatyana Tarasova, Nonna Mordyukova, Yelena Malysheva, Valeria Novodvorskaya, Ada Rogovtseva, Ekaterina Starshova, Yelena Stepanenko, and other famous people, deserving recognition and love five.

He actively acts in films, tours in Russia with entrepreneurial performances.

Selected filmography
 Blood for Blood (1991) as episode
 Wood Grouse (2008—2009) as Olga Alekseevna, Head of the International Bureau
 Daddy's Daughters (2009—2010) as Roza Lvovna
 Univer (2009) as teacher
 All Inclusive (2011) as woman who keeps repeating
 Yolki 2 (2011) as Natalya,  Olya's mother
 Zhukov (2011) as Larisa, fashion designer
  (2011) as Irina Borisovna Lokteva
 Paws, Bones and Rock'n'roll (2015) as Nastya's grandmother
  (2018) as apartment owner

Personal life
The first husband is a fellow student on GITIS, director Yuri Nepomnyashchy. From this marriage there is a son Anton. The second husband is musician Yuri Shumidub, 14 years younger than Galina.

References

External links
 Official site

1951 births
Living people
People from Barnaul
Soviet film actresses
Russian film actresses
Soviet stage actresses
Russian stage actresses
Russian television actresses
Russian television presenters
Honored Artists of the Russian Federation
Russian Academy of Theatre Arts alumni
Russian parodists
Russian women television presenters